There are 20 species of leeches living in the wild in the Czech Republic. 

19 species were recorded in Moravia.

Species
in zoological order

(One species is missing in this list.)

Erpobdelliformes
Erpobdellidae
 Erpobdella lineata (O. F. Müller, 1774)
 Erpobdella nigricollis (Brandes, 1900)
 Erpobdella octoculata (Linnaeus, 1758)
 Erpobdella testacea (Savigny, 1822)
 Erpobdella vilnensis Liskiewicz, 1927
 Erpobdella bykowskii Gedroyc, 1913

Hirudiniformes
 Hirudinidae
 Haemopis sanguisuga (Linnaeus, 1758)
 Hirudo medicinalis Linnaeus, 1758

Rhynchobdellida
Glossiphoniidae
 Batracobdella paludosa (Carena, 1824)
 Glossiphonia complanata (Linnaeus, 1758)
 Glossiphonia concolor (Apathy, 1888)
 Glossiphonia heteroclita (Linnaeus, 1761)
 Glossiphonia nebulosa (Kalbe, 1964)
 Glossiphonia slovaca (Košel, 1972)
 Helobdella stagnalis (Linnaeus, 1758)
 Hemiclepsis marginata (O. F. Müller, 1774)
 Theromyzon tessulatum (O. F. Müller, 1774)
Piscicolidae
 Piscicola geometra (Linnaeus, 1758)
 Caspiobdella fadejewi (Epstein, 1961)

See also
 Fauna of the Czech Republic

External links
 

Leeches
Czech, leech
Leeches